Damith Indika (born 9 January 1984) is a Sri Lankan cricketer. He played 50 first-class and 36 List A matches between 2001 and 2011. He was also part of Sri Lanka's squad for the 2002 Under-19 Cricket World Cup.

References

External links
 

1984 births
Living people
Sri Lankan cricketers
Nondescripts Cricket Club cricketers
Sinhalese Sports Club cricketers
Sri Lanka Army Sports Club cricketers
Cricketers from Colombo